Sankt Annæ Plads 5 is a Neoclassical property constructed in 1796 by city builder Jørgen Henrich Rawert for his own use on the north side of Sankt Annæ Plads in central Copenhagen, Denmark.  The building was a few years later used by him as a model for the design of the building at Sankt Annæ Plads 11 and most likely also for an adaption of the facade of the building at Amaliegade 45. It was listed on the Danish registry of protected buildings and places in 1918. The Danish Labour Court is now based in the building.

History

Jørgen Henrich Rawert
 
The site was formerly part of the garden of the Lindencrone Mansion at the corner of Bredgade. The mansion was from 1789 owned by Johan Friedrich Lindencrone. He suffered from economic difficulties and in 1794 sold off a portion of the garden to city builder Jørgen Henrich Rawert. The new building on the property was constructed by Rawert in 1796 with the intension of keeping it as his personal residence. He was residing at Sankt Annæ Plads 10 on the other side of the square while the construction took place.

On the completion of his new property, Rawert did move into one of the apartments, but already in 1798 moved to a new home in Borgergade.

Moltke family
The building on Sankt Annæ Plads was acquired by the Moltke family.  Christian Günther von Bernstorff resided in the building from 1800 to 1811. The property was in the new cadastre of 1806 listed as No. 109.

Engelke Colbiørnsen (née, Galbe, 1763-1747), the widow of Christian Colbiørnsen, resided on the second floor in the last part of her life. Her unmarried daughterChristiane   was both at the time of the 1840 and 1845 censuses living with her mother in the apartment.. Engelke Colbiørnsen's brother-in-law, Charles Borre, Baron de Selby (1890-1849), whose wife Christiane (née Falbe, 1786-1843) had died in 1843, was by 1845 residing with three unmarried daughters in the apartment on the first floor.

At the time of the 1850 census, one Count Moltke Hvitfeldt (c. 1915-) resided on the ground floor. Heinrich von Reventlow-Criminil (1798-1869) resided in the building from 1854 to 1856. With the introduction of street numbering in 1859, No. 109 became No. 5.

2+6h century
Det forenede Oliekompagni purchased the building in 1926. It was subsequently with the assistance of the architects Alfred Skjøt-Petersen (1897-1979) and Curt von Lüttichau (1897-1991) adapted for its new use as company headquarters.

Architecture
 

The building consists of three storeys over a raised cellar and is seven bays wide. Two gates with arched transom windows are located in the outer bays of the building. The five central bays have rusticated finishing on the ground floor and Giant order Ionic pilasters on the upper floors. The second and sixth window in the ground floor are topped by triangular pediments. and there are blind balustrades under the three central windows on the first floor.  A relief frieze is seen between the windows on the second and third floors. The facade is finished by a cornice supported  by corbels.

Today
The Danish Labour Court is today based in the building.

Gallery

References

External links

 Vintage inmage

Listed residential buildings in Copenhagen
Neoclassical architecture in Copenhagen
Residential buildings completed in 1796
1796 establishments in Denmark